Wilson Masoud (born June 12, 1991) is an American football quarterback who is currently a free agent. He was invited to mini camp with the New York Giants as an undrafted free agent in 2013. He played college football at Bethel University.

References

External links
Bethel Wildcats bio
Arena Football League bio

1991 births
Living people
American football quarterbacks
People from Madison County, Tennessee
Columbus Lions players
Orlando Predators players
Bethel Wildcats football players